Karlović is a Croatian surname. Notable people with the surname include:

 Ivo Karlović, Croatian tennis player
 Ivan Karlović, Ban of Croatia
 Mario Karlović, Croatian Australian soccer player

See also

 Tomás Carlovich, Argentine football player
Karlovich

Croatian surnames
Patronymic surnames
Surnames from given names